Gustav Ludwig Hertz (22 July 1887 – 30 October 1975) was a German experimental physicist and Nobel Prize winner for his work on inelastic electron collisions in gases, and a nephew of Heinrich Rudolf Hertz.

Biography
Hertz was born in Hamburg, the son of Auguste (née Arning) and a lawyer, Gustav Theodor Hertz (1858–1904), Heinrich Rudolf Hertz' brother. He attended the Gelehrtenschule des Johanneums before studying at the Georg-August University of Göttingen (1906–1907), the Ludwig Maximilian University of Munich (1907–1908), and the Humboldt University of Berlin (1908–1911). He received his doctorate in 1911 under Heinrich Leopold Rubens.

From 1911 to 1914, Hertz was an assistant to Rubens at the University of Berlin.  It was during this time that Hertz and James Franck performed experiments on inelastic electron collisions in gases, known as the Franck–Hertz experiments, and for which they received the Nobel Prize in Physics in 1925.

During World War I, Hertz served in the military from 1914. In 1915 he joined Fritz Haber's unit that would introduce poisonous chlorine gas as a weapon. He was seriously wounded in 1915.  In 1917, he returned to the University of Berlin as a Privatdozent.  In 1920, he took a job as a research physicist at the Philips Incandescent Lamp Factory in Eindhoven, which he held until 1925.

Career
In 1925, Hertz became ordinarius professor and director of the Physics Institute of the Martin Luther University of Halle-Wittenberg.  In 1928 he became ordinarius professor of experimental physics and director of the Physics Institute of the Technische Hochschule Berlin ("THB"), now Technical University of Berlin.  While there, he developed an isotope separation technique via gaseous diffusion. Since Hertz was an officer during World War I, he was temporarily protected from National Socialist policies and the Law for the Restoration of the Professional Civil Service, but eventually the policies and laws became more stringent, and at the end of 1934, he was forced to resign his position at THB, as he was classified as a "second degree part-Jew" (his paternal grandfather Gustav Ferdinand Hertz (originally named David Gustav Hertz) (1827–1914) had been Jewish as a child, before his whole family had converted to Lutheranism in 1834).  He then took a position at Siemens, as director of Research Laboratory II.  While there, he continued his work on atomic physics and ultrasound, but he eventually discontinued his work on isotope separation.  He held this position until he departed for the Soviet Union in 1945.

In the Soviet Union

"Pact to defect"
Hertz was concerned for his safety and, like his fellow Nobel laureate James Franck,  was looking to move to the USA or any other place outside Germany.  So he made a pact with three colleagues:  Manfred von Ardenne, director of his private laboratory Forschungslaboratorium für Elektronenphysik, Peter Adolf Thiessen, ordinarius professor at the Humboldt University of Berlin and director of the Kaiser-Wilhelm Institut für physikalische Chemie und Elektrochemie (KWIPC) in Berlin-Dahlem, and Max Volmer, ordinarius professor and director of the Physical Chemistry Institute at the THB.  The pact was a pledge that whoever first made contact with the Soviets would speak for the rest.  The objectives of their pact were threefold: (1) Prevent plunder of their institutes, (2) Continue their work with minimal interruption, and (3) Protect themselves from prosecution for any political acts of the past. Before the end of World War II, Thiessen, a member of the Nazi Party, had Communist contacts.

Participation in Soviet Nuclear Project
On 27 April 1945, Thiessen arrived at von Ardenne's institute in an armored vehicle with a major of the Soviet Army, who was also a leading Soviet chemist.  All four of the pact members were taken to the Soviet Union.  Hertz was made head of Institute G, in Agudseri (Agudzery), about 10 km southeast of Sukhumi and a suburb of Gul'rips (Gulrip'shi).  Topics assigned to Gustav Hertz's Institute G included:
(1) Separation of isotopes by diffusion in a flow of inert gases, for which Gustav Hertz was the leader,
(2) Development of a condensation pump, for which Justus Mühlenpfordt was the leader,
(3) Design and build a mass spectrometer for determining the isotopic composition of uranium, for which Werner Schütze was the leader,
(4) Development of frameless (ceramic) diffusion partitions for filters, for which Reinhold Reichmann was the leader, and
(5) Development of a theory of stability and control of a diffusion cascade, for which Heinz Barwich was the leader;

Barwich had been deputy to Hertz at Siemens. Other members of Institute G were Werner Hartmann and Karl-Franz Zühlke. Manfred von Ardenne was made head of Institute A. Goals of von Ardenne's Institute A included: (1) Electromagnetic separation of isotopes, for which von Ardenne was the leader, (2)  Techniques for manufacturing porous barriers for isotope separation, for which Peter Adolf Thiessen was the leader, and (3) Molecular techniques for separation of uranium isotopes, for which Max Steenbeck was the leader.

In his first meeting with Lavrentij Beria, von Ardenne was asked to participate in building the bomb, but von Ardenne quickly realized that participation would prohibit his repatriation to Germany, so he suggested isotope enrichment as an objective, which was agreed to.

Research at Sukhumi
By the end of the 1940s, nearly 300 Germans were working at the institute, and they were not the total work force. Institute A was used as the basis for the Sukhumi Physical-Technical Institute in Sinop, a suburb of Sukhumi. Volmer went to the Scientific Research Institute No. 9 (NII-9). in Moscow; he was given a design bureau to work on the production of heavy water.  In Institute A, Thiessen became leader for developing techniques for manufacturing porous barriers for isotope separation.

In 1949, six German scientists, including Hertz, Thiessen, and Barwich were called in for consultation at Sverdlovsk-44, which was responsible for uranium enrichment.  The plant, smaller than the American Oak Ridge gaseous diffusion plant, was getting only a little over half of the expected 90% or higher enrichment.

After 1950, Hertz moved to Moscow. In 1951, Hertz was awarded a Stalin Prize, second class, with Barwich.  In that year, James Franck and Hertz were jointly awarded the Max Planck Medal by the Deutsche Physikalische Gesellschaft.  Hertz remained in the Soviet Union until 1955.

Return to the GDR
Upon return from the Soviet Union, Hertz became ordinarius professor at the University of Leipzig.  From 1955 to 1967, he was also the chairman of the Physical Society of the Deutsche Demokratische Republik (GDR); he was honorary chairman from 1967 to 1975.

Personal life
Gustav Hertz was a nephew of Heinrich Rudolf Hertz and a cousin of Mathilde Carmen Hertz. In 1919, Hertz married Ellen née Dihlmann, who died in 1941.  They had two sons, Carl Helmut Hertz and Johannes Heinrich Hertz; both became physicists.

He died on 30 October 1975 in East Berlin at the age 88.

Scientific memberships
Hertz was a Member of the German Academy of Sciences in Berlin, Corresponding Member of the Göttingen Academy of Sciences, an Honorary Member of the Hungarian Academy of Sciences, a Member of the Czechoslovakian Academy of Sciences, and a Foreign Member of the USSR Academy of Sciences.

Publications

Gustav Hertz Über das ultrarote Adsorptionsspektrum der Kohlensäure in seiner Abhängigkeit von Druck und Partialdruck. (Dissertation). (Vieweg Braunschweig, 1911)
Gustav Hertz (editor) Lehrbuch der Kernphysik I-III  (Teubner, 1961–1966)
Gustav Hertz (editor) Grundlagen und Arbeitsmethoden der Kernphysik (Akademie Verlag, 1957)
Gustav Hertz Gustav Hertz in der Entwicklung der modernen Physik (Akademie Verlag, 1967)

See also
Electron diffraction
Electric glow discharge
Franck–Hertz experiment
Plasma window
Vacuum tube
Scattering
Russian Alsos

References

Further reading
 Albrecht, Ulrich, Andreas Heinemann-Grüder,  and Arend Wellmann Die Spezialisten: Deutsche Naturwissenschaftler und Techniker in der Sowjetunion nach 1945 (Dietz, 1992, 2001) 
 Barwich, Heinz and Elfi Barwich Das rote Atom (Fischer-TB.-Vlg., 1984)
 Beneke, Klaus Die Kolloidwissenschaftler Peter Adolf Thiessen, Gerhart Jander, Robert Havemann, Hans Witzmann und ihre Zeit (Knof, 2000)
 Heinemann-Grüder, Andreas Die sowjetische Atombombe (Westfaelisches Dampfboot, 1992)
 Heinemann-Grüder, Andreas Keinerlei Untergang: German Armaments Engineers during the Second World War and in the Service of the Victorious Powers in Monika Renneberg and Mark Walker (editors) Science, Technology and National Socialism 30–50 (Cambridge, 2002 paperback edition) 
 Hentschel, Klaus (editor) and Ann M. Hentschel (editorial assistant and translator) Physics and National Socialism: An Anthology of Primary Sources (Birkhäuser, 1996) 
 Holloway, David Stalin and the Bomb: The Soviet Union and Atomic Energy 1939–1956 (Yale, 1994) 
 Kruglov, Arkadii The History of the Soviet Atomic Industry (Taylor and Francis, 2002)
 Maddrell, Paul "Spying on Science: Western Intelligence in Divided Germany 1945–1961" (Oxford, 2006) 
 Mehra, Jagdish, and Helmut Rechenberg The Historical Development of Quantum Theory. Volume 1 Part 1 The Quantum Theory of Planck, Einstein, Bohr and Sommerfeld 1900–1925: Its Foundation and the Rise of Its Difficulties. (Springer, 2001) 
 Naimark, Norman M. The Russians in Germany: A History of the Soviet Zone of Occupation, 1945–1949 (Belknap, 1995)
 Oleynikov, Pavel V. 2000.  German Scientists in the Soviet Atomic Project. The Nonproliferation Review Volume 7, Number 2, 1 – 30  The author has been a group leader at the Institute of Technical Physics of the Russian Federal Nuclear Center in Snezhinsk (Chelyabinsk-70).

External links

 
SIPT – Sukhumi Institute of Physics and Technology, on the website are published the photographs of the German nuclear physicists who had been working for the Soviet nuclear program

1887 births
1975 deaths
Nobel laureates in Physics
German Nobel laureates
20th-century  German physicists
Experimental physicists
German people of Jewish descent
Scientists from Berlin
Scientists from Hamburg
Humboldt University of Berlin alumni
Quantum physicists
Ludwig Maximilian University of Munich alumni
Academic staff of Leipzig University
Nuclear weapons program of the Soviet Union
Academic staff of the Technical University of Berlin
East German scientists
German expatriates in the Soviet Union
Foreign Members of the USSR Academy of Sciences
Winners of the Max Planck Medal
People educated at the Gelehrtenschule des Johanneums
Members of the German Academy of Sciences at Berlin
Burials at the Ohlsdorf Cemetery